The Akins are a Gospel Music group of up to three brothers and their father. They write their own songs and play all of their own instruments.

David, the father, began in 1988 when his three sons Dave, Nick, and Eli were children. While leading music at a youth retreat, David met a man named Jonathan whose father was a well known preaching evangelist and had recently died. Jonathan told David that he knew his father loved him, but he was in high demand and was usually not able to be at home. This inspired David to form a group with his sons.

In July 2008 The Akins signed with Crossroads Records.  They are two time "Horizon Group of the Year" nominees by Singing News Magazine, and have received multiple nominations at the Inspirational Country Music Awards of the Christian Country Music Association including, "Entertainer of the Year," "Vocal Group of the Year," and "Christian Country Song of the Year."  

Their 2017 album release, "Eyes On The Road" features the new single and music video, "Dying To Be With You".

Members

David Akin- Piano, Acoustic Guitar, Vocals
Dave Akin- Bass Guitar
Nick Akin- Acoustic Guitar, Drums, Vocals
Eli Akin - Electric Guitar, Acoustic Guitar, Mandolin, Sax, Vocals

Discography

Discography 
2008: Good Tired
2009: The Akins
2010: The Akins - Live In Concert (DVD / 2 CD combo)
2012: The Akins - Based On A True Story
2014: The Akins - Vintage
2017: Akins - Eyes On The Road

Popular Singles
I Want My Stage To Be An Altar
What If God Says No
Kneel
Joyful, Joyful, We Adore Thee
Dying To Be With You

Awards
 2010 "Horizon Group of the Year" Nominee.

References

External links
 

American gospel musical groups
Gospel quartets
Family musical groups
Musical groups established in 1988